An unnamed lake is a body of water with no official nor generally agreed upon name.  Such a lake is officially nameless though it may have one or more unofficial names used locally.  This is common for many tiny lakes, farm ponds, and minor lakes in remote areas.

Designated
A lake designated as unnamed can be distinguished from a lake actually named Unnamed Lake by its capitalization. Some lakes named the latter are:
 northwestern Montana, U.S. 

References

Lakes
Place names